The Roman Catholic Diocese of Awka is a diocese located in the city of Awka, Anambra State in the Ecclesiastical province of Onitsha in Nigeria. The Diocese boasts of having the highest number of priests amongst other Catholic dioceses in Africa as a whole.

History
 10 November 1977: Established as Diocese of Awka from the Metropolitan Archdiocese of Onitsha
 5 March 2020: Lost territory to the newly created Diocese of Ekwulobia

Special churches
The Cathedral is St. Patrick's Cathedral in Awka.

Bishops 

 Bishops of Awka (Roman rite)
 Bishop Albert Kanene Obiefuna (10 November 1977 Appointed - 9 September 1994 Appointed, Coadjutor Archbishop of Onitsha)
 Bishop Simon Akwali Okafor (9 September 1994 Appointed - 17 April 2010 Retired)
 Bishop Paulinus Chukwuemeka Ezeokafor (8 July 2011 – present)

Auxiliary Bishops
Solomon Amanchukwu Amatu (2000-2005), appointed Coadjutor Bishop of Okigwe
Paulinus Chukwuemeka Ezeokafor (2007-2011), appointed Bishop here
Simon Akwali Okafor (1992-1994), appointed Bishop here
Jonas Benson Okoye (2014-2021)

Other priest of this diocese who became bishop
Peter Ebere Okpaleke, appointed Bishop of Ahara in 2012

See also 
 Roman Catholicism in Nigeria

References

Sources
 GCatholic.org Information
 Catholic Hierarchy

Roman Catholic dioceses in Nigeria
Christian organizations established in 1977
Roman Catholic dioceses and prelatures established in the 20th century
1977 establishments in Nigeria
Roman Catholic Ecclesiastical Province of Onitsha